Pasquale "Pasqualino" De Santis (24 April 1927 – 23 June 1996) was an Italian cinematographer.

Biography
Born in Fondi, he was the brother of film director Giuseppe De Santis. They worked together in Non c'è pace tra gli ulivi, Uomini e lupi (1956), La strada lunga un anno (1958) and  La garçonnière (1960).

He collaborated with Francesco Rosi in C'era una volta (1967), Uomini contro (1970), Il caso Mattei (1972), Lucky Luciano (1974), Cristo si è fermato a Eboli (1979), Tre fratelli (1981), Carmen (1984), Cronaca di una morte annunciata (1987), Diario napoletano (1992) and La tregua (1996), filmed in Ukraine, where he died.

He worked with  Luchino Visconti (La caduta degli dei, 1969; Death in Venice, 1971; Conversation Piece, 1974; L'Innocente, 1976), Federico Fellini (Fellini: A Director's Notebook, 1969),  Joseph L. Mankiewicz (The Honey Pot, 1966), Vittorio De Sica (Amanti, 1968), Joseph Losey (The Assassination of Trotsky, 1972), Carlo Lizzani (Torino nera, 1972), Robert Bresson (Lancelot du Lac, 1974; Le diable probablement, 1977; L'Argent, 1982), Ettore Scola (A Special Day, 1977; La terrazza, 1980), Giuliano Montaldo (Marco Polo, 1982).

Awards and nominations

Academy Awards

British Academy Film Awards

Primetime Emmy Award

César Awards

David di Donatello

Golden Ciak Awards

Globo d'oro

Nastro d'Argento

Laurel Awards

References

External links 

1927 births
1996 deaths
People from the Province of Latina
Best Cinematographer Academy Award winners
Best Cinematography BAFTA Award winners
Italian cinematographers
Centro Sperimentale di Cinematografia alumni
David di Donatello winners